Clay Pigeon is a 1971 American action film directed by Lane Slate and Tom Stern and written by Ronald Buck, Jack Gross, Jr. and Buddy Ruskin. The film stars Tom Stern, Telly Savalas, Robert Vaughn, John Marley, Burgess Meredith and Ivan Dixon. The film was released on August 1971, by Metro-Goldwyn-Mayer.

Plot
A Vietnam War veteran (Stern) has been using illegal drugs, but eventually decides that he wants to escape that life. But before he can leave it behind, a CIA narcotics agent (Savalas) recruits him to go undercover in Los Angeles to help expose other ex-soldiers who are involved in drug dealing and drug kingpin Neilson (Vaughn).

Cast 
 Tom Stern as Joe Ryan
 Telly Savalas as Redford
 Robert Vaughn as Neilson
 John Marley as Police Captain
 Burgess Meredith as Freedom Lovelace
 Ivan Dixon as Simon
 Jeff Corey as Clinic Doctor
 Marilyn Akin as Angeline
 Marlene Clark as Saddle
 Belinda Palmer as Tracy
 Mario Alcalde as Jason
 Peter Lawford as Government Agent

Reception

Critical response
Roger Greenspun of The New York Times wrote in his review: "Clay Pigeon also makes no sense. But its directors, Tom Stern and Lane Slate, have a certain willingness to take each moment as it comes, and its absurdities more often seem the products of a super-active exuberance than of a failed imagination. In its particular field—sex and violence—"Clay Pigeon" just falls short of being very good."

Release
Clay Pigeon was released in theatres in August 1971. The film was released on DVD on April 27, 1999 and later on July 6, 2010 by PolyGram Filmed Entertainment.

See also
 List of American films of 1971

References

Sources

External links 
 

1971 films
American action films
1971 action films
Metro-Goldwyn-Mayer films
1970s English-language films
1970s American films